Nagarkhas, also known as Oyum-Nagar, is the headquarters of the Nagar District of Gilgit–Baltistan and is one of the largest towns in that district. Situated on the bank of the Nagar River, it was also the capital of the former princely state of Nagar.

Today, the famous Karakoram Highway crosses Nagar, connecting Pakistan to China via the Khunjerab Pass. The road follows the Hunza-Nagar River for some distance through Nagar and into the Hunza District.

Location

Nagar lies in the Nagar River valley, about five miles south-east of the junction of the Nagar River with the Hunza River, just below Baltit.

The Nagar Valley, previously known as Broshal, is situated at an elevation of 2,688m (8822 feet). Nagarkhas is the main town and was the capital of the former princely state of Nagar. The Ghulmet, Minapin, BAR, Chaprote and Hopper Valleys are popular tourist attractions in the Nagar District because of their spectacular scenery. Some of the most intimidating high mountain peaks on earth such as Rakaposhi at 7,788m (25,561 feet), Diran, the Spantik Peak (also known as the Golden Peak), and several others are located in the Nagar District.

Rakaposhi Peak, Nagar (Gulmet)

Hisper Biafo Glacier, Nagar (Hisper)

History

Following the Hunza-Nagar Campaign of 1889–1892 (known locally as the Anglo-Burusho war) the area came under British control and then became a vassal of the Kashmir durbar but continued to be ruled by the royal family of Nagar. In 1974, Zulfiqar Ali Bhutto dissolved the princely states of Nagar and Hunza and gave them democratic representation in the Northern Areas Council, now known as the Gilgit-Baltistan Legislative Assembly. The British wanted to expand trade with Russia from both Nagar and Hunza, but the states wouldn't ≤≤≤≤permit them to do so.

References

Bibliography

Further reading
Leitner, G. W. (1893): Dardistan in 1866, 1886 and 1893: Being An Account of the History, Religions, Customs, Legends, Fables and Songs of Gilgit, Chilas, Kandia (Gabrial) Yasin, Chitral, Hunza, Nagyr and other parts of the Hindukush, as also a supplement to the second edition of The Hunza and Nagyr Handbook. And An Epitome of Part III of the author's "The Languages and Races of Dardistan". First Reprint 1978. Manjusri Publishing House, New Delhi.
Where three Empires meet by E.F.Night.
Buroshall Say Nagar Tak ka Safar by Mohammad Ismail Tehseen.
Brushaal Ke Qabail by Syed Yahya Shah
Rakaposhi Nagar (راکاپوشی نگر) (Travelogue, 2015) by Mustansar Hussain Tarar

Populated places in Nagar District